is a Japanese manga by Hiroshi Masumura. It was adapted into a CG animated film in 2006.

Cast
 Kōichi Yamadera as Hideyoshi
 Asahi Uchida as Tempura
 Aya Hirayama as Princess Tsukimi
 Etsuko Kozakura as Hideko
 Seiichi Tanabe as Gilbars
 Mari Natsuki as Queen Pirea
 Kei Tani as Amigen
 Shirou Sano as Ryukoma
 Hiroko Taniyama as Themari

References

External links
 
 

1976 manga
Manga series
Asahi Sonorama manga
Shōnen manga